Milad Zeneyedpour (born 21 March 1986) is an Iranian professional footballer who plays as a left winger for Kakkonen club Ilves-Kissat.

Club career
Having played for the Iran national under-20 football team in India, he caught the attention of Saipa head coach Ali Daei and in 2007 he joined to Saipa. Since then the young starlet has managed to impose himself on to the starting line up where he has managed to develop a name for himself. He joined to Damash Gilan in summer 2011 and spent one season at the club. Then, he signed a three-years contract with Iran Pro League defending champion, Sepahan on 12 June 2012. Milad decided to leave Sepahan soon because he was not happy about his status in the new team, and agreed to separate from his team on mid-season of his first year with Sepahan. He joined Paykan on 17 December 2012 and signed on 1 January 2013 after his contract was terminated by Sepahan. After Paykan's relegation, he joined Malavan in summer 2013 but was loaned to Zob Ahan.

On 10 September 2015, Zeneyedpour joined Iraqi side Erbil.

Club career statistics
Last Update : 14 February 2022

 Assist Goals

International
Zanidpour represented Iran in India in Asian Football Confederation's under 20s championship as a left back.
After the appointment of Ali Daei as the Team Melli coach Zanidpour got his first call up on 12 March 2008 the senior team.

International goals
Scores and results list Iran's goal tally first.

Honours
WAFF Championship
Winner (1): 2008

References

External links

1986 births
Living people
People from Ahvaz
Iranian footballers
Association football wingers
Foolad FC players
Saipa F.C. players
Paykan F.C. players
Rah Ahan players
Steel Azin F.C. players
Damash Gilan players
Sepahan S.C. footballers
Zob Ahan Esfahan F.C. players
Malavan players
Naft Masjed Soleyman F.C. players
Erbil SC players
Milad Zeneyedpour
Gostaresh Foulad F.C. players
Madura United F.C. players
UKM F.C. players
Sarawak FA players
Persian Gulf Pro League players
Iraqi Premier League players
Azadegan League players
Milad Zeneyedpour
Liga 1 (Indonesia) players
Malaysia Premier League players
Kakkonen players
Iran international footballers
Iran under-20 international footballers
Iranian expatriate footballers
Iranian expatriate sportspeople in Iraq
Iranian expatriate sportspeople in Thailand
Iranian expatriate sportspeople in Indonesia
Iranian expatriate sportspeople in Malaysia
Expatriate footballers in Iraq
Expatriate footballers in Thailand
Expatriate footballers in Indonesia
Expatriate footballers in Malaysia
Sportspeople from Khuzestan province